Mohd Assri Merzuki (born 28 December 1994) is a Malaysian tennis player.

Assri has a career high ATP singles ranking of 1333 achieved on 10 November 2014. He also has a career high ATP doubles ranking of 795 achieved on 20 February 2012.

Assri made his ATP main draw debut at the 2015 Malaysian Open, Kuala Lumpur in the doubles draw partnering Syed Mohd Agil Syed Naguib. Assri represented Malaysia in the Davis Cup.

ATP Challenger and ITF Futures finals

Doubles: 3 (1–2)

References

External links

1994 births
Living people
Malaysian male tennis players
Malaysian people of Malay descent
Malaysian Muslims
Competitors at the 2015 Southeast Asian Games
Southeast Asian Games bronze medalists for Malaysia
Southeast Asian Games medalists in tennis
21st-century Malaysian people